Chang Sŏng-man (Korean: 장성만, 2 November 1932 – 6 December 2015) was a South Korean pastor, educator, and politician. He served as a Member of the National Assembly for North District of Busan from 1981 to 1988, and also the Deputy Speaker of the National Assembly from 1987 to 1988. He was also the former Chancellor of Dongseo University.

Chang was one of the notable figures who built a welfare state model during his MP career. He established various universities, including Dongseo University, where he used to be its Chancellor.

Career 
Born in Busan, Chang attended to Busan Technical High School, and earned bachelor's degree in theology from University of Cincinnati. He used to work as a pastor before he established Dongseo Christian Vocational School (now Kyungnam College of Information & Technology), the first vocational college in South Korea, in 1965.

Chang started his political career as one of the promoter of Democratic Justice Party (DJP), the predecessor of Liberty Korea Party (LKP), in January 1981. He was elected unopposed to the National Assembly representing North District of Busan in the elections after 2 months, and re-elected in 1985 election. In 1987, he was elected as the sole Deputy Speaker of the National Assembly, after the main opposition United Democratic Party (UDP) decided to not put its candidate due to the internal conflict.

Chang consecutively lost to Moon Jung-soo in 1988 and 1992 election. Instead, he established Dongseo Engineering College (now Dongseo University) in 1991 and served as its Chancellor till 2008. In 2001, he also founded Dongseo Cyber University (now Busan Digital University).

He died on 6 December 2015, after a chronic disease, aged 83. His widow, Park Dong-soon (born 1939), is the current Chancellor of Dongseo University. He also left 3 children, including Chang Je-kuk (born 1964), the current President of the university, Chang Je-won (born 1967), a Member of the National Assembly (2008-2012, 2016-), and Chang Ju-young.

Controversies 
On 8 March 1988, Chang faced huge protests from opposition MPs after he and DJP rushed a revised electoral law through without any agreements. It was reported that Yoo Soo-ho, the father of Yoo Seong-min, was also involved into the controversy.

On 17 April 1997, Chang was arrested by prosecution due to the corruption charges. It was reported that he set up around 5 billion won (≒ 5 million USD) and misused most of it.

Election results

References 

1932 births
2015 deaths
South Korean politicians
South Korean educators
South Korean pastors